The 1916 Rhode Island gubernatorial election was held on November 7, 1916. Incumbent Republican Robert Livingston Beeckman defeated Democratic nominee Addison P. Munroe with 55.92% of the vote.

General election

Candidates
Major party candidates
Robert Livingston Beeckman, Republican
Addison P. Munroe, Democratic

Other candidates
John H. Holloway, Socialist
Roscoe W. Phillips, Prohibition
Thomas F. Herrick, Socialist Labor

Results

References

1916
Rhode Island
Gubernatorial